Worlds may refer to:
 Worlds (book), a collection of science fiction and fantasy short stories by Eric Flint
 Worlds (Joe Lovano album), 1989
 Worlds (Porter Robinson album), 2014
Abbreviated name for a world championship event

See also
 World (disambiguation)